Daniel Baker is a Sinn Féin politician who was elected to the Northern Ireland Assembly from Belfast West in the 2022 election.

Early life 
Baker attended De La Salle College and St Colm's High School in Twinbrook, Belfast.

Political career 
Baker was co-opted onto Belfast City Council in 2017, and re-elected in 2019, representing the Collin electoral area. He was Lord Mayor of Belfast between December 2019 and June 2020 after incumbent Lord Mayor John Finucane was elected MP for Belfast North in the 2019 UK general election.

References 

Living people
Sinn Féin MLAs
21st-century politicians from Northern Ireland
Northern Ireland MLAs 2022–2027
Politicians from Belfast
Lord Mayors of Belfast
Sinn Féin councillors in Northern Ireland
Year of birth missing (living people)